GWE may refer to:

 Gigawatt electrical (GWe)
 Gweno language, native to Tanzania
 Gwersyllt railway station, in Wales
 Gweru-Thornhill Air Base, in Zimbabwe